John Ernest Gregory (24 September 1926 – 10 October 1995) was an English footballer who played as an inside forward in the 1950s. He played in the Football League for West Ham United, Scunthorpe United and Aldershot and in non-league football for Bromley and St Neots Town. He top-scored in his first season with Scunthorpe, and scored more than 20 goals in each of the next two seasons.

Gregory's son John played six times for England and went on to a managerial career.

References

1926 births
1995 deaths
Footballers from Shoreditch
English footballers
Association football inside forwards
Bromley F.C. players
West Ham United F.C. players
Scunthorpe United F.C. players
Aldershot F.C. players
St Neots Town F.C. players
English Football League players